The Skirmish of Tongue was a battle that took place in March 1746 near Tongue in the Scottish Highlands  during the Jacobite Rising of 1745.

Background
On 25 March 1746 a French ship named the Le Prince Charles, formerly HMS Hazard, which carried £13,000 in gold, arms and other supplies to Inverness for the Jacobite leader Charles Edward Stuart ran into the Kyle of Tongue while being pursued by the British frigate . During the night the crew and soldiers disembarked carrying the money, however the following day Captain George Mackay, son of the chief of the Clan Mackay, who supported the British government confronted them at a place named Drum Nan Coup and after a short fight Mackay captured the men and the money.

The battle
An account of the fight was reported in the London Gazette of 15 April 1746:

Aberdeen, April 6. Captain Mackay, Lord Reay's son, and Sir Henry Munro, son of the late Sir Robert, both Captains in Lord Loudon's regiment, are just come hither with letters from Captain O'Brian of Sheerness man of war, now off this place giving an account that after chasing the Le Prince Charles above 56 leagues he drove her ashore and obliged the French and Spaniards who were in her to quit her and to land, which they did with five chests of money to the value of £12,000 and upwards, in order to join the rebels; but the Lord Reay (Mackay) in whose country they were landed and whose house Captain Mackay, Sir Henry Munro, Lord [?Captain]  Charles Gordon, and Captain MacLeod with some others of Lord Loudon's regiment were, with about 80 men of said regiment, who had been driven thither by the rebels, marched out and attacked them, and after killing three or four, and dangerously wounding eight, took the remaining 156, officers, soldiers, and sailors prisoners, who were immediately embarked on board the Sheerness, and the prize with the Highland officers and men who made the capture are now here.....The money that was landed out of the Hazard sloop, was taken by Lord Reay's men.

Aftermath and significance
Historian Ruairidh MacLeod gives details of what was done with the money captured from the Jacobites. Captain George Mackay, Sir Harry Munro, Lord Charles Gordon, John MacLeod, Lieutenant Reid, and Ensign MacLaggan all received £700 each of the captured booty. Ensign Aneas Mackay received £200. Lieutenant Daniel Forbes received £100. The sergeants each received £50 and the privates each got £7 or £8 which was the equivalent to eight or nine months pay. According to historian R. W Munro writing in 1977, the captured money amounted to £12,000 and was mostly English Gold.

Historian Angus Mackay in the Book of Mackay writes of the significance of the Skirmish of Tongue as having more to do with the overthrow of Charles Edward Stuart at Culloden than is generally realized by the fact that money and supplies had been cut off that were destined for the Jacobites. In the aftermath of the conflict at Tongue the Mackays continued to fight against the Jacobite rebels in the Highlands, defeating the Jacobite Mackenzie, Earl of Cromarty at the Battle of Littleferry.

References

Tongue
Tongue
Tongue
Tongue